Ji Liya (born 1981, Chinese name: 吉麗雅) is a Chinese gymnast. She competed at  the 1995 World Artistic Gymnastics Championships, winning a silver medal on Floor and team with Mo Huilan, Liu Xuan, Meng Fei, Mao Yanling, Qiao Ya, Ye Linlin.  She also competed at the 1996 Atlanta Olympic Games, finishing eighth in the floor routine and was  a part of the Chinese team that finished in fourth position.

Eponympous skill
Ji has one eponymous skill listed in the Code of Points.

References

1981 births
Living people
Chinese female artistic gymnasts
Gymnasts at the 1996 Summer Olympics
Medalists at the World Artistic Gymnastics Championships
Olympic gymnasts of China
Gymnasts from Hunan
People from Hengyang